Elections were held in Bruce County, Ontario, Canada, on October 25, 2010, in conjunction with municipal elections across the province.

Bruce County Council

Arran-Elderslie

Brockton

Huron-Kinloss

Kincardine

Northern Bruce Peninsula

Saugeen Shores

South Bruce

South Bruce Peninsula

Bruce County
2010 Ontario municipal elections